The 2018 Big Ten Conference men's soccer tournament is the 28th edition of the tournament. It determined the Big Ten Conference's automatic berth into the 2018 NCAA Division I Men's Soccer Championship. Wisconsin enters the tournament as the defending champions. The Number 1 Seeded Indiana beat the number 3 seeded Michigan in the Big Ten Tournament Championship Game 3 to 0. Indiana won its 13th Big Ten Tournament title.

Seeds
All nine Big Ten schools participated in the tournament. Teams were seeded by conference record, with a tiebreaker system used to seed teams with identical conference records. The top 10 teams received a first round bye and the top four teams received a double bye. Tiebreaking procedures remained unchanged from the 2016 Tournament.

Bracket

Schedule

First round

Quarterfinals

Semifinals

Final

Top goalscorers
2 goals
 Spencer Glass - Indiana
 Noah Melick - Wisconsin
 Matt Moderwell - Northwestern
 Umar Farouk Osman - Michigan

1 goal
 Alex Alfaro - Wisconsin
 Rece Buckmaster - Indiana
 Camden Buescher - Northwestern
 Ben Di Rosa - Maryland
 Ryan Gallagher - Penn State
 Brandon Golden - Rutgers
 Jeremaih Gutjahr - Indiana
 Andrew Gutman - Indiana
 Miles Hackett - Rutgers
 Jordan Hall - Rutgers
 Jack Hallahan - Michigan
 Noah Leibold - Wisconsin
 Sean Lynch - Northwestern
 Eric Matzelevich - Maryland
 Jake Scheper - Ohio State
 Isaac Schlenker - Wisconsin
 Cory Thomas  - Indiana
 Marc Ybarra - Michigan
 Patrick Yim - Wisconsin

All-Tournament team

Andrew Gutman, Indiana - Defensive Player of the Tournament
Francesco Moore, Indiana
Cory Thomas, Indiana - Offensive Player of the Tournament
Amar Sejdic, Maryland
Robbie Mertz, Michigan
Jackson Ragen, Michigan
Connor Corrigan, Michigan State
Matt Moderwell, Northwestern
Ryan Gallagher, Penn State
Jordan Hall, Rutgers
Isaac Schlenker, Wisconsin

See also 
 Big Ten Conference Men's Soccer Tournament
 2018 Big Ten Conference men's soccer season
 2018 NCAA Division I Men's Soccer Championship
 2018 NCAA Division I men's soccer season
 2017 Big Ten Conference Men's Soccer Tournament

References

External links 

Big Ten Men's Soccer Tournament
Big Ten Conference Men's Soccer Tournament
Big Ten Men's Soccer Tournament